BlueSG (stylised as blueSG) is a Singaporean company providing electric car sharing and electric car charging services. Announced in September 2017, the company, a subsidiary of Goldbell, launched the service in December of the same year, with 30 charging stations and 80 all-electric Bolloré Bluecar for public use on a paid subscription basis.

On 5 February 2021, it was announced that BlueSG was to be acquired by Goldbell Group, a Singaporean commercial vehicles and industrial equipment distribution and leasing company, with the acquisition completed in October 2021. The company's charging stations were also sold and acquired by TotalEnergies. As of December 2020, the company had 374 charging stations located across Singapore and a fleet of 667 cars.

History

In June 2016, Bolloré signed an agreement with the Land Transport Authority (LTA) and the Economic Development Board to develop an electric car-sharing programme. On 27 September 2017, BlueSG announced with LTA to launch Singapore's first large scale electric car sharing programme, with the service's electric car supplied by Bolloré. The company also opened their Asia-Pacific headquarters for its e-mobility, energy management and system integration business for the region. Bolloré used to operate several similar electric car-sharing services such as Autolib' in Paris, BlueIndy in Indianapolis and Bluecity in London, but failed to achieve scalability and has since ceased to operate in these 3 cities.

Construction of the charging stations began at the end of September 2017 and in December 2017, the service was officially opened to the public with 30 charging stations and 80 cars located throughout the island. BlueSG planned to expand the service to offer 2,000 charging points in 500 charging locations, with 400 charging points open for public use and 1,000 electric cars deployed by 2020. In January 2018, within the first 3 weeks of operations, over 3000 members signed up for the service, with 5000 rentals completed.

In December 2018, it was announced that BlueSG will open its charging stations to privately owned electric vehicles from the first quarter of 2019. The charging service was officially launched in April 2019, with a total of 25 charging stations open to privately owned electric vehicles on a yearly subscription basis.

Acquisition by Goldbell and TotalEnergies
In February 2021, Goldbell Group, a Singaporean company, announced it had acquired BlueSG from Bolloré and the acquisition was finalised by October of the same year, after being in discussions since June 2020. According to Singapore's Accounting and Corporate Regulatory Authority, BlueSG has been in a deficit since its launch, with the company making a loss of S$9.3 million in 2019. After the acquisition was completed in October 2021, Goldbell would be investing around S$70 million in the company within the next 5 years to expand BlueSG's services and fleet, with plans to introduce different models of electric vehicles into its fleet and to set up a new research and development centre that will be developing new mobility technologies and algorithms and to expand the service regionally.

On 28 July 2021, it was announced that the network of 1,500 BlueSG charging stations was sold to TotalEnergies, which would continue to operate and maintain the charging stations.

Operations and fleet

Anyone aged 21 years and above with a valid Singapore driving license, ASEAN driving license or an International driver's permit can sign up for the service through the BlueSG mobile application or their official website. Users can choose between 2 rental plans, with per minute fees of S$0.36 (increased from S$0.33 from 1 March 2021). An available car can be booked through the mobile application or at the charging station itself. A parking space can also be reserved through the application prior to returning the car to the charging station, or users can park at any available lot that is not already reserved.

BlueSG introduced 2 rental packages on 1 October 2019, with the packages originally available for durations of 3 hours and 5 hours rentals respectively, which were only available from Monday to Friday. On 1 March 2021, with per minute fees increased to S$0.36, the prices for the rental packages was also revised and the 5 hour package was replaced with a 4 hours one instead, with the 3 hours package plan now available for use from Monday to Sunday, while the 4 hours plan is only available from Monday to Friday.

The table below summaries the subscription types available, the subscription fees, pricing for the per minute rates and rental packages:

Private EV charging service
The BlueSG charging service was officially launched in April 2019, with users having to sign up for the charging services through BlueSG's official website and a yearly subscription fee will be charged in addition to per-minute charging fees.

The table below summaries the subscription types available for the charging service:

Fleet

The service uses the all-electric Bolloré Bluecar, which were adapted to suit Singapore's left-hand traffic.

Gallery

See also
Autolib'
Bluecity

References

External links
 

Carsharing
Electric vehicles
Transport in Singapore
2017 introductions
2017 establishments in Singapore
Transport companies established in 2017
Transport companies of Singapore
Singaporean brands